Makhlanu or Makhaliyan Chak is a small Indian village approximately 2 km from Chamba in Tehri Garhwal district, Uttarakhand. It is situated in the Garhwal Region of the Himalayas on the bank of the Ganges at a height of about 1600 metres. It has the best view of Maniyar Patti of Tehri Garhwal. The village is spread over an area of about 1.5 Hectares and is home to hill flowers, seasonal fruits and some wild species of Himalayas.

History
One Bane singh kunwar moved from chamoli district and settled at tehri garhwal around six generations ago. He has a son namely laxman kunwar who gov married to a gusain girl of dobhal gaon and eventually settled there. He has two sons of whom one namely krishan singh kunwar settled at dobhal gaon and acquired burans-badi in dan from guldi village. He had four sons viz. Bahadur singh, Soban singh, Anup singh and Bhagwan singh. The other son settled in makhlanu.  He had two sons prem singh kunwar and jyot singh kunwar

Population
As per the 2001 Census the population of Makhaliyan Chak is:

References

Cities and towns in Tehri Garhwal district